Francis Peter "Frank" Mouris (born September 6, 1944) is an American animator. He is best known for his film Frank Film (1973), for which he won an Academy Award for Best Animated Short Film.

Career
Other films he made alongside wife Caroline include Coney (1975), Impasse (1978), the live action feature Beginner's Luck (1986) and Frankly Caroline (1999). He also contributed animations to Sesame Street.

Legacy
Frank Film was added to the National Film Registry in 1996.

Original picture and sound negatives, as well as preservation negatives on a number of the Mourises' films, are held at the Academy Film Archive in Hollywood collection and the Yale Film Archive in New Haven.

Frank Film was also preserved by the Academy Film Archive.

References

External links
 Frank Mouris on IMDB
 Profile at ACME Filmworks

1944 births
Living people
Collage filmmakers
Directors of Best Animated Short Academy Award winners
American animators
American animated film directors
American experimental filmmakers
Producers who won the Best Animated Short Academy Award
Yale School of Art alumni
Harvard College alumni